Epes the Southerner (translit: Efes ha-Daromi) or Rabbi Epes, was a scholar of the 3rd century, secretary to the patriarch Judah haNasi, and one of the last tannaim. After Judah's death, while Efes conducted a college in southern Judea, on account of which he was called "Efes (in Yerushalmi, "Pas") Daromi", he was made head of the academy at Sepphoris, although the dying patriarch had ordered the appointment of Hanina b. Hama to that position. Hanina refused to supersede Efes, who was his senior by two years and a half.

Hoshaiah Rabbah was one of his disciples, and reported in his name several aggadic remarks, among them one bearing on Isaiah 60:3: "Nations shall walk by thy light," from which he argues that Jerusalem will in the future become a torch by the light of which people will walk. Hoshaiah also reported a civil law in Efes' name, and Shimon ben Lakish asked him a question of halacha.

Efes did not survive Judah haNasi by many years. He was succeeded by Hanina ben Hama.

References

 It has the following bibliography:
Frankel, Mebo, p. 122a;
Halevy, Dorot ha-Rishonim, ii. 133a et seq.;
Bacher, Ag. Pal. Amor. i. 91;
Heilprin, Seder ḥa-Dorot, ii., s.v.;
Weiss, Dor, iii. 44.

Mishnah rabbis
Ancient Israel and Judah
3rd-century rabbis
Talmud rabbis